Goré is a town and the capital of the La Nya Pendé in Chad's Logone Oriental Region.

Near Goré, the refugee camps of Amboko, Gondjé, and Dosseye along the Pendé River have been home to refugees from the Central African Republic. As of 2009, "in and around Gore, over 15,000 children ... [were] currently enrolled in the more than 25 schools supported by UNICEF. This includes more than 6,000 refugee pupils. UN agricultural programs are helping the refugees move towards food self sufficiency.

In April 2014, Chadian troops escorting a convoy of "the last 540 Muslim residents" of Bossangoa, Central African Republic to Goré, Chad were attacked by local militia as they passed through Boguila. Three people were wounded.

The town is home to a UNHCR office and a hospital.

Climate 
The city has a Tropical savanna climate .
<div style="width:75%">

References

External links 

Populated places in Chad
Logone Oriental Region
Refugee camps in Africa